The Ministry of Transport and Communications was department of the Government of Kazakhstan, providing leadership and intersectoral coordination on the development and implementation of state policy in the field of transport and communications.

On 6 August 2014, during the reorganization of the Government, the Ministry was abolished and its functions were transferred to the new Ministry for Investment and Development.

References

Transport and Communications
1994 establishments in Kazakhstan
Ministries established in 1994
2014 disestablishments in Kazakhstan
Ministries disestablished in 2014
Kazakhstan
Kazakhstan